Tomorrow Is Another Day (Chinese: 再戰明天) is an TVB prison drama produced by Lam Chi-wah. This series was featured in the TVB's 2014 Sales Presentation. A costume fitting ceremony was held on 27 January 2014.

Production
Tomorrow Is Another Day is the first drama series produced by TVB about the Hong Kong Correctional Services. The drama was filmed in several actual prisons in Hong Kong.

Cast and characters

Correctional Services Department (CSD)

Prisoners

Others

References

External links

{K-TVB.net | http://k-tvb.net/new-series-tomorrow-is-another-day/}

TVB dramas
Hong Kong drama television series
Television series set in the 2010s
Prison television series
2014 Hong Kong television series debuts
2014 Hong Kong television series endings
2010s Hong Kong television series
2010s prison television series